Kanneganti Brahmanandam (born 1 February 1956), known mononymously as Brahmanandam, is an Indian actor, comedian, impersonator, and voice actor known for his works predominantly in Telugu cinema. He is particularly known for his comic performances. He holds the Guinness World Record for the most screen credits for a living actor, appearing in over 1000 films to date. He was awarded an honorary doctorate by Acharya Nagarjuna University. In 2009, he was honoured with the Padma Shri, the fourth-highest civilian award in India, for his contribution to Art. Brahmanandam is one of the highest-paid comic actors in India.

After completing his Master of Arts degree, Brahmanandam worked as a Telugu lecturer in Attili of West Godavari district, Andhra Pradesh. Simultaneously, he also worked in theatre and as a mimicry artist. He made his television debut in 1985 with DD Telugu's Pakapakalu which received appreciation from the audience. After watching his performance in the show, director Jandhyala cast him in the film Aha Naa Pellanta! (1987), which became his breakthrough role. In a career spanning over 35 years, he has garnered six state Nandi Awards, one Filmfare Award South, and six CineMAA Awards.

Early life
Brahmanandam was born on 1 February 1956 in Sattenapalle, Andhra Pradesh. His parents are Nagalingachari and Lakshmi Narsamma. His father was a carpenter and Brahmanandam was one of eight children. He completed his Master of Arts degree and joined as a Telugu lecturer in Attili of West Godavari district.

Career 
While working as a lecturer, Brahmanandam also worked in theatre and as a mimicry artist. Novelist and playwright Adi Vishnu introduced him to NCV Sashidhar of Doordarshan (DD). Soon after, he made his television debut in 1985 with DD Telugu's Pakapakalu. His performance in the show received good response from the audience. After watching his performance in the show, director Jandhyala cast him in the film Aha Naa-Pellanta! (1987), which became a breakthrough role for him. The same year he appeared in the successful films Pasivadi Pranam and Swayam Krushi. The first film he acted in was Sri Tatavataram, second film was Satyagraham, and the third film was Aha Naa Pellanta!. Sri Tatavataram released later in 1988.

The following years he appeared in several Telugu films, of which, his performance in the films Vivaha Bhojanambu (1988), Choopulu Kalisina Shubhavela (1988), Bandhuvulostunnaru Jagratha (1989), Muddula Mavayya (1989), Jagadeka Veerudu Atiloka Sundari (1990), Bobbili Raja (1990) and Bamma Maata Bangaru Baata (1990) was well praised.

Beginning from 1991, Brahmanandam has appeared in variety of comedic roles and a few intense roles. In 1991, he starred in major films such as Kshana Kshanam (1991) and Rowdy Alludu (1991). The Times of India considered the films Chitram Bhalare Vichitram (1991), Jamba Lakidi Pamba (1992), and Yamaleela (1994) as the films that one can never get bored of. Brahmanandam has appeared in each of these, with him being considered as one of the main reasons for these films to be successful. In 1992, he has played the lead role in Babai Hotel for the first time.

He won his first major awardNandi Award for Best Male Comedian for his performance as Khan Dada in the film Money (1993). Following the success of the film, a sequel to it, Money Money (1994) was also produced, in which Brahmanandam reprised his role. Griddaluru Gopalrao of Zamin Ryot in his review of the film Hello Brother (1994) praised Brahmanandam's role and his performance. His further successful films of the following years include Alluda Majaka (1995), Intlo Illalu Vantintlo Priyuralu (1996), Bombay Priyudu (1996), Anaganaga Oka Roju (1997), Muddula Mogudu (1997), Bavagaru Bagunnara? (1998), Aavida Maa Aavide (1998), Thammudu (1999), Kshemamga Velli Labhamga Randi (2000), Jayam Manade Raa (2000), Kalisundam Raa (2000), and Ammo! Okato Tareekhu (2000).

At a felicitation ceremony in January 2008, he listed the following films as his top 11 films  Aha Naa Pellanta! (1987), Vivaha Bhojanambu (1988), Chitram Bhalare Vichitram (1991), Pattukondi Chuddam (1997), Money (1993), Anaganaga Oka Roju (1997), Anna (1994), Amma (1991), Bavagaru Bagunnara? (1998), Manmadhudu (2002), Dhee (2007).

Personal life 
Brahmanandam married Lakshmi and has two sons, Raja Gautham and Siddharth. Gautham is also an actor who starred in films such as Pallakilo Pellikoothuru (2004), and Manu (2018). Gautham is married and has a son born in 2017. In January 2019, Brahmanandam underwent a successful heart bypass surgery at Asian Heart Institute (AHI) in Mumbai.  

Apart from acting, Brahmanandam is also an amateur sculptor and a sketch artist. He also reads the philosophical writings of Swami Vivekananda and Jiddu Krishnamurthi in his free time.

Awards and honours
Civilian honors
 In January 2009, the government of India bestowed the title of Padma Shri, the fourth-highest civilian award, on Brahmanandam for his contributions to art.
Guinness Book
 Guinness World Record for the most screen credits for a living actor.

 Filmfare Awards
 Filmfare Award for Best Comedian – Telugu – Manmadhudu (2002)

 Nandi Awards
 Best Male Comedian – Money (1993)
 Best Supporting Actor – Anna (1994)
Best Comedian – Anaganaga Oka Roju (1995)
Best Comedian – Vinodam (1996)
Best Comedian – Ready (2008)
Best Comedian – Race Gurram (2014)

 CineMAA Awards
  CineMAA Award for Best Comedian – Manmadhudu, Dhee, Konchem Ishtam Konchem Kashtam, Adhurs & Dookudu

 South Indian International Movie Awards
 SIIMA Award for Best Comedian (Telugu) – Dookudu (2011)
 SIIMA Award for Best Comedian (Telugu) – Baadshah (2013)
 SIIMA Award for Best Comedian (Telugu) – Race Gurram (2014)
 Other
 Hyderabad Times Film Awards Best Actor in a Comic Role – Dookudu (2011)
TSR – TV9 National Film Award for Best Comedian – Attarintiki Daredi (2013)

Filmography

Brahmanandam acted in more than 1,000 films.

Selected filmography

 1987: Aha Naa Pellanta as Ara Gundu
 1990: Jagadeka Veerudu Atiloka Sundari as Vichitra Kumar
 1992: Babai Hotel as Rama Chandra Moorti
 1993: Rajendrudu Gajendrudu as Bank Manager
 1993: Money as Khan Dada
 1993: Jamba Lakidi Pamba as Anandam
 1993: Abbaigaru as Housekeeper
 1994: Yamaleela as Chitragupta
 1994: Alibaba Aradajanu Dongalu as Thief
 1995: Alluda Majaka as Abbulu/Ms. Dakota
 1995: Ghatotkachudu as Scrap Collector
 1996: Anaganaga Oka Roju as Michael Jackson
 1997: Annamayya as Pundit
 1998: Bavagaru Bagunnara? as Gopi
 1998: Ganesh as Sub-Jailor Kondal Rao
 Sooryavansham as a doctor
 2001: Nuvvu Naaku Nachav as Photographer
 2002: Indra as Pundit
 2002: Manmadhudu as Sooribabu Lavangam
2003:Simhadri as Talupulu
 2004: Venky as Gajala
 2005: Evadi Gola Vaadidhi as Shankar Dada RMP
 2005: Athadu as kittu
 2006: Happy as Appala Naidu, Pizza Shop Owner
 2006: Pokiri as Brahmi – The Software Engineer
 2006: Vikramarkudu as Duvva Abbulu
 2007: Mozhi as Ananthakrishnan
 2007: Dhee as Chary
 2007: Dubai Seenu as Ramakrishna
 2007: Yamadonga as Chitragupta
 2008: Krishna as Bobby
 2008: King as Jayasurya
 2008: Jalsa as Pranav
 2008: Ready as "McDowell" Murthy
 2008: Neninthe as Director Idli Vishwanath
 2009: Konchem Ishtam Konchem Kashtam as Gachibowli Diwakar
 2009: Kick as Halwa Raj/Parugu Prakash Raj
 2009: Ganesh: Just Ganesh as Yadagiri
 2009: Arya 2 as Dasavatharam
 2009: Raju Maharaju as Om Raja
 2010: Adhurs as Bhattacharya "Bhattu"
 2010: Namo Venkatesa as Paris Prasad
 2010: Brindavanam as Bommarillu father
 2011: Dookudu as Padmashri
 2011: Mr.Perfect as Jalsa Kishore (maternal uncle of Priya)
 2011: Payanam as Director Rajesh Kapur
 2012: Julai as Thief
 2013: Jaffa as Jasmine "Jaffa" Falguda
 2013: Naayak as Jilebi
 2013: Yevadu as Satya's illegal tenant
 2013: Balupu as Crazy Mohan
 2013: Attarintiki Daredi as Baddam Bhaskar
 2013: Doosukeltha as Veera Brahmam
 2013: Baadshah as Padmanabha Simha
 2013: Mirchi as Veera Pratap 
 2013: Ninnindale kannada film as Sachin
 2014: Race Gurram as Kill Bill Pandey
 2014: Loukyam as Sippy
 2014: Aagadu as Delhi Suri
 2015: Bruce Lee: The Fighter as Susuki Subramanyam
 2015: S/O Satyamurthy as Koda Rambabu, Devaraj's brother-in-law
 2016: Sarrainodu as Linga Hariharan, Umapati's neighbor
 2017: Nenu Kidnap Ayyanu as Cameo Appearance
 2017: Khaidi No. 150 as Doberman
 2017: Om Namo Venkatesaya as Simhachalam
 2018: Nela Ticket as Balaraju
 2018: Achari America Yatra as Appalacharya
 2018: Gayatri as Loknatham
 2018: MLA as Pattabhi
 2018: Aatagallu as Go Go
 2018: Inttelligent as Dharma Raju
 2018: Jai Simha as Raju Reddy
 2018: Silly Fellows as Fake DGP
 2019: Amma Rajyam Lo Kadapa Biddalu as Rambabu
 2019: Gaddalakonda Ganesh as Cameo appearance
 2019: Manmadhudu 2 as Suribabu Lavangam
 2019: 1st Rank Raju as Manormani
 2019: Lisaa as LKG
 2019: NTR: Kathanayakudu as Relangi
 2020: Ala Vaikunthapurramuloo as Special Appearance
 2020: Namaste Nestama as Dog trainer
 2021: Jathi Ratnalu as Justice Balwanth Chowdhary
 2022: Bheemla Nayak as Judge K. B. Ananda Rao
 2022: Panchathantram as Veda Vyas
 2022: Aadavallu Meeku Johaarlu as Buchi
 2022: Rangamarthanda as TBA

References

External links

 
 

1956 births
Living people
Male actors in Tamil cinema
Filmfare Awards South winners
Indian male comedians
Male actors from Andhra Pradesh
Male actors in Telugu cinema
Indian male film actors
Nandi Award winners
People from Guntur district
Recipients of the Padma Shri in arts
Telugu male actors
Telugu comedians
20th-century Indian male actors
21st-century Indian male actors
South Indian International Movie Awards winners
Indian male voice actors